Adeeba Hassan is a Pakistani politician who has been a member of the Provincial Assembly of Sindh since August 2018.

Political career

She was elected to the Provincial Assembly of Sindh as a candidate of Pakistan Tehreek-e-Insaf (PTI) on a reserved seat for women in 2018 Pakistani general election.

References

Living people
Sindh MPAs 2018–2023
Pakistan Tehreek-e-Insaf MPAs (Sindh)
Year of birth missing (living people)
Place of birth missing (living people)
Women members of the Provincial Assembly of Sindh
21st-century Pakistani women politicians